Penicillium nordicum is an anamorph species of fungus in the genus Penicillium which produces ochratoxin A. Penicillium nordicum contaminates protein rich foods and foods with high NaCl-konzentration. It is mostly found on dry-cured meat products and cheese products

Further reading

References 

nordicum
Fungi described in 1985